Jorge Carlos Tarud Daccarett (born 19 July 1953) is a Chilean politician, militant from Party for Democracy (PPD).

On 28 October 2020, he run into the primaries of his party for being presidential pre-candidate.

References

External links
 BCN Profile

1953 births
Living people
Members of the Chamber of Deputies of Chile
University of Chile alumni
20th-century Chilean politicians
21st-century Chilean politicians
Party for Democracy (Chile) politicians
Democrats (Chile) politicians
People from Santiago
Ambassadors of Chile to Australia
Ambassadors of Chile to China
Ambassadors of Chile to Saudi Arabia